Hillel J. Kieval is a historian of Jewish culture who holds the Gloria M. Goldstein Professorship of Jewish History and Thought at Washington University in St. Louis. He has written multiple books about the history of the Jews in Bohemia and Moravia.

Works

References

Living people
Washington University in St. Louis faculty
Historians of Jews and Judaism
Year of birth missing (living people)
Historians of the Czech lands
Jewish American historians